Taylor Mitchell Martin is an Australian politician. He has been a Liberal member of the New South Wales Legislative Council since 3 May 2017, and was re-elected at the 2019 New South Wales state election.

Martin is an active member and volunteer with Surf Life Saving Australia.

Early life 
Martin grew up on the New South Wales Central Coast. He was the first member of his family to study at university, studying Finance, Commerce, and Economics at University of Newcastle. During his time there, Martin became the Treasurer of the University Finance Club.

Martin got his start in politics after a chance meeting with then candidate for the Federal Division of Robertson, Lucy Wicks, becoming a member of the Liberal Party soon after.

Martin has previous worked at the firm Mercer Financial Services, his family's kitchen fabrication business, and as an advisor to Federal MP Lucy Wicks.

Political career 
Martin was preselected by the Liberal Party to fill a casual vacancy caused by the resignation of Mike Gallacher, and subsequently was elected as the youngest member of the New South Wales Legislative Council. Elected at the age of 26, Martin is the youngest member of the Parliament of New South Wales. Martin was re-elected at the 2019 New South Wales state election, and is currently serving an eight-year term set to expire in 2027.

In Martin's inaugural speech he highlighted small business support, bullying, and domestic violence as his priority policy areas. He also spoke on the emergence of technology and its impact on future regulation and jobs.

Martin has been appointed to and chaired a number of committees since his election, being the Public Works Committee, Select Committee on Electricity Supply, Demand and Prices in New South Wales, Portfolio Committee No. 1 - Premier and Finance, Standing Committee on State Development, Portfolio Committee No. 6 - Planning and Environment, Committee on the Ombudsman, the Law Enforcement Conduct Commission and the Crime Commission, and Portfolio Committee No. 3 – Education.

References

Living people
Members of the New South Wales Legislative Council
Liberal Party of Australia members of the Parliament of New South Wales
Year of birth missing (living people)
21st-century Australian politicians